Chimbu can refer to

 the Simbu Province (formerly Chimbu) of Papua New Guinea
 Kuman language (New Guinea), also known as Simbu or Chimbu
 , also known as Simbu or Kuman
 Chimbu River
 Chimbu Airport in Kundiawa, Papua New Guinea.